Francis George Welch (August 21, 1895 – June 19, 1970) was an American football player and coach, track and field coach, and college athletics administrator. He was of the first three coaches to be selected for the National Association of Intercollegiate Athletics Track and Field Hall of Fame and is a member of the Kansas Sports Hall of Fame.

In 1960, Emporia State University named the football stadium Francis G. Welch Stadium to honor his legacy.

Playing career
Welch enrolled in Kansas State Normal School (now Emporia State University) in 1914. Head football coach Homer Woodson Hargiss put him at quarterback where he remained until graduation four years later. He also displayed skill in baseball and basketball, earning 11 varsity letters before his graduation in 1918.

Coaching career

Football
Welch was the 13th head football coach for Emporia State University in Emporia, Kansas and he held that position for 24 seasons, from 1928 until 1954. Emporia State, like many schools, did not play football during World War II.  His overall coaching record at Emporia State was 115–82–15.

Welch led his team to a victory in the Missouri-Kansas Bowl with a 34–20 victory over Missouri State University on December 4, 1948 in Kansas City, Missouri. It was the only year the bowl game was played.  It was Emporia's first post-season football game.

Welch (along with Washburn University coach Dick Godlove) also coached an "all-star" team made up of Kansas players to play a similar squad from Missouri in the "Mo-Kan Bowl" all-star exhibition game.

Track and field
Welch coached the track and field teams at Emporia as well. His teams were conference champs ten times, won four NAIA championships and placed second three times in 13 years of competition. Fran developed three NCAA individual champions and 13 individual NAIA champs.

In 1960, Welch was selected to coach field event participants of the United States Women's Track and Field Team for the 1960 Summer Olympics in Rome.

Personal life
Welch was awarded a Bachelor of Science in education in 1918 from Kansas Normal, then completed requirements for a degree in agriculture at Kansas State University in Manhattan, Kansas. He served as a United States Army lieutenant in World War I and took a leave of absence from teaching to serve in World War II as a captain and special services officer at Fort Riley.

Head coaching record

References

1895 births
1970 deaths
American football quarterbacks
Emporia State Hornets baseball players
Emporia State Hornets athletic directors
Emporia State Hornets football coaches
Emporia State Hornets football players
Emporia State Hornets basketball players
Emporia State Hornets track and field coaches
Fort Riley Centaurs football coaches
Kansas State University alumni
United States Army personnel of World War I
United States Army personnel of World War II
United States Army officers
People from Lyon County, Kansas
American men's basketball players